Sabrina Varrone (born 24 April 1972) is a former Italian female long-distance runner and cross-country runner who competed at individual senior level at the World Athletics Cross Country Championships (1997, 1999, 2000).

Biography
Varrone won a silver medal at senior level with the national team at the 1999 European 10,000m Cup. She also won Cross della Vallagarina in 1999.

National titles
She won three national championships at individual senior level.
Italian Cross Country Championships
Long race: 1998, 1999
Short race: 2002

See also
 Italian team at the running events

References

External links
 

1972 births
Living people
Italian female long-distance runners
Italian female cross country runners
Sportspeople from the Metropolitan City of Turin
People from Carignano